KVBC may refer to:

 KVBC-LP, a low-power television station (channel 13) licensed to serve Reedley, California, United States
 KSNV-DT, a television station (channel 2/virtual channel 3) licensed to serve Las Vegas, Nevada, United States, which held the call sign KVBC or KVBC-DT until 2010